Walker Scott, also Walker-Scott or Walker's, was a chain of department stores in San Diego and surrounding area from 1935 to 1986 and had eight branches at the time of its closure. It was founded by Ralf Marc (or R.M.) Walker and George A. Scott.

History
Trained under Arthur Letts at Los Angeles' Broadway department store, Ralf Marc Walker was the co-founder/co-worker owner of the 125,000-square-foot department store known as the Fifth Street Store at Fifth and Broadway in downtown Los Angeles, established in 1905. Walker also owned what would later become known as the Houdini Mansion in Laurel Canyon. He died six months before the opening of the San Diego store on October 3, 1935. 

George A. Scott (b. Scotland, 1907 — d. United States, 1993) was a protégé of Walker, who had sent him to the New York University of Retailing and had treated him as a son; the two men had a very close personal relationship.

Downtown flagship
In 1935, the former Holzwasser's department store building, in San Diego's downtown shopping district at the northwest corner of 5th and Broadway, had been sitting empty for over two years after the 1933 liquidation of Holzwasser's, once San Diego's largest department store. The Spanish Colonial Revival building had been built in 1919; John Terrel Vawter was the architect.

Scott and Walker traveled to San Diego to investigate the possibilities of opening a branch of Walker's in the ex-Holzwasser space, and decided to do so. They renovated the interior and the first and second floors of the exterior; the Quayle Brothers were the architects for this renovation. Seven days before the planned grand opening, Walker died, on September 25, 1935. 

Seven days later, on October 2, Scott opened the store with Mr. Walker's widow, Eliza Fitzgerald Walker, who became president of the company while Scott took the position of vice president. Present at the opening reception were Arthur H. Marston, son of George W. Marston, who had attended the Holzwasser's opening fifteen years before, and Charles S. Holzwasser, who had owned the by-then-defunct Holzwasser store that had occupied the site.

The store employed 503 people at opening of which 482 were local from San Diego. First year sales volume was $800,000. Escalators were added and the store was expanded into the Owl Drug building to the west. in 1954, the store was renamed Walker Scott.

1969-70 chain expansion
Three full-line stores opened in the 1970 fiscal year, and sales for that year were around $36 million, with earnings of $850,000. There was also one located in the College Grove Shopping Center, located adjacent to Lemon Grove, CA. (https://en.wikipedia.org/wiki/College_Grove_Shopping_Center)

Winding-down
In 1984-5 Walker Scott eliminated major-appliance departments and de-emphasizing hardline areas such as housewares and small appliances. In January 1985, facing competition from other stores, the firm closed its downtown and La Jolla stores, leaving it with 12 outlets. Later that same year, Walker Scott sold to Los Angeles retailer Desmond's & Associates. In November 1986 Walker Scott closed its remaining stores.

Branches
Branches and their years of opening:
 1935 Downtown San Diego, 1014 Fifth Avenue, NW corner of 5th and Broadway (formerly Holzwasser's department store)
 1959 La Jolla (Walker's purchased Stevenson's Department Store, which it operated under its original name for a time). Closed in 1985.
 1960 College Grove Shopping Center, in eastern San Diego adjacent to Lemon Grove; upon opening it was the largest Walker's store.
 1963 Linda Vista Shopping Center
 1964 Escondido Village: The  cost $3,750,000, and officially opened with a ribbon-cutting at 11 A.M. on Monday, April 6, 1964. The store's interior design was by Brand-Worth & Associates. Walls, floors and fixtures were color coordinated. The signage was custom-made in classic raised Roman alphabet. The store featured a specially-made multi-color carpet in eight related shades around the perimeter of the store, in a progressive spectrum from red to blue. The men's department carpet was dark blue, the dress department reds and purples, the juniors and lingerie departments pink and orchid colors, and in ladies' sportswear, vermilion and lavender. There were wall murals in classic Roman themes by Rick Chase, a Southern California muralist. Other walls were covered in metal sculptures, including acid-etched brass trees in recesses in the walls of the apparel areas. In the sportswear department, three sculptured metal trees were made with more than 9,000 stylized leaves. Decorative grill work enclosed the glass well of the escalators.
 1968 Clairemont and El Cajon (bought Whitney's Department Stores and operated them by that name for a time). Clairemont store was relocated to Clairemont Square. A third Whitney's outlet was converted to a Walker-Scott home and gift center.
 1970, added fabric stores in Lakeside, Ocean Beach (later a men's a women's sportswear specialty shop) and El Cajon
 1970 City of Orange, The City shopping center, 160,000 sq. ft., replaced by May Company in 1974.
 1970 Palm Springs (Palm Springs Mall), replaced by Buffums in 1989, later Harris Gottschalks in 1990.
1970: Solana Beach, Lomas Santa Fe Plaza, which in 1988 or 1989 was bought by and opened as Buffums
 1973 San Carlos
 1973 Mission Valley Shopping Center
 1975 Mira Mesa, 
 1976 Oceanside
 1982 National City
 1983 Pacific Beach

References

Defunct department stores based in San Diego
Retail companies established in 1935
Retail companies disestablished in 1986
Companies based in San Diego
Buildings and structures in San Diego